Saint-Fulgence is a municipality in Quebec, Canada.

References

External links

Municipalities in Quebec
Incorporated places in Saguenay–Lac-Saint-Jean